"Amaia Montero" is the debut solo album by Spanish singer Amaia Montero, after an eleven-year music career as the frontwoman for La Oreja de Van Gogh. It was released in Spain on 18 November 2008 by Sony BMG. "Quiero Ser" (English: I want to be) was the first single released from the album. According to "Promusicae" Amaia Montero was the Ninth biggest selling album of 2008 in Spain, for surpassing sales of 81,000 in less than 2 months (six weeks). The album was nominated for Best Female Pop Vocal Album at the 2009 Latin Grammy Awards.

Production 
Having no plans of working with professional writers, Montero wrote and recorded her first solo album in the Italian cities of Genoa and Milan, and mixed the songs at Henson Recording Studios in Los Angeles CA.

Among the songs there is one dedicated to her father, her mother and another also devoted one of the songs to her former colleagues in La Oreja de Van Gogh, for the 11 years they worked together. Their last work together was Guapa, the best-selling album of 2006 in Spain and much of Latin America, with 11-platinum and three gold around the world.

Track listing

Singles 
 "Quiero Ser" - (2008)
 "Ni Puedo Ni Quiero" - (2008) (released only in Chile)
 "4"" - (2009)
 "Te Voy a Decir una Cosa" - (2009)
 "Mirando al Mar" - (2010)

Charts and certifications

Charts

Certifications

Release history

References 

Amaia Montero albums
2008 albums